"Back of the Bottom Drawer" is a song co-written and recorded by American country artist Chely Wright. It was co-written with Julian Williams, songwriter Liz Rose and was released as a single in 2004 via Dualtone Records and Vivaton Records. The song was Wright's first single release in three years and her first issued through an independent record label. The song became a top 40 hit on the country chart in 2004 and was later released on the extended play, Everything.

Background and recording
Chely Wright had several years of success with the major Nashville record label, MCA Records. Wright had commercial hits with songs such as "Shut Up and Drive" (1997) and "Single White Female" (1999). She was later dropped from MCA and became the first artist to sign with the independent Nashville label, Vivaton Records. According to an interview with Country Music Television, Wright believed the song to be "special" after composing it with Liz Rose. The lyrics of the song were written from Wright's own experiences of saving mementos in small spaces: "I’m 33 years old, I’ve got a couple of champagne corks, and those are my stories, and I don’t have to tell about it." "Back of the Bottom Drawer" was recorded at The Sound Kitchen, a studio located in Nashville, Tennessee. The project was co-produced by Wright herself, along with Jeff Huskins.

Critical reception
"Back of the Bottom Drawer" received positive reviews from critics. Deborah Evans Price of Billboard gave the song a favorable response in her review of recent singles to reach radio in 2004. Price described the song as "passionate, poignant, and flawlessly-delivered." Evans commented that the song described not only physical things, but also goals for what the character in the song wanted to become: "Here she delivers a beautifully written song about mementos hidden in a drawer that represent not only memories from the past but stepping stones to the woman she is still trying to become." Bobby More of Wide Open Country named the song one of Wright's "10 Best of Her Career" and called it a "sentimental ballad about a woman's box of knick-knacks that reminds her of the mistakes that prepared her to become the right woman for her current partner."

Release and chart performance
In 2004, "Back of the Bottom Drawer" was released as a single via Vivaton Records in February 2004. In its original release, the single was released to radio programmers on a compact disc and had the song repeat three times. The song spent 15 weeks on the Billboard Hot Country Songs chart and peaked at number 40 in May 2004. It was Wright's first charting single in three years and among her final songs to reach the country top 40 on Billboard. A full studio album was originally intended for release in August 2004. However, it had been announced that June that Wright had left the Vivaton label, citing "creative differences" with producer Jeff Huskins. Instead the song was released on an extended play in October 2004 titled, Everything. In February 2005, it was released on Wright's studio album titled The Metropolitan Hotel. A music video was later released for the song, which was directed by Trey Fanjoy.

Track listing
CD single

(Single repeats three times, according to CD release information)
 "Back of the Bottom Drawer" – 3:44
 "Back of the Bottom Drawer" – 3:44
 "Back of the Bottom Drawer" – 3:44

Charts

Weekly charts

References

2004 singles
2004 songs
Chely Wright songs
Music videos directed by Trey Fanjoy
Songs written by Liz Rose
Songs written by Chely Wright